In mathematics, and especially gauge theory, Donaldson theory is the study of the topology of smooth 4-manifolds using moduli spaces of anti-self-dual instantons. It was started by Simon Donaldson (1983) who proved Donaldson's theorem restricting the possible quadratic forms on the second cohomology group of a compact simply connected 4-manifold.  Important consequences of this theorem include the existence of an Exotic R4 and the failure of the smooth h-cobordism theorem in 4 dimensions. The results of Donaldson theory depend therefore on the manifold having a differential structure, and are largely false for topological 4-manifolds. 

Many of the theorems in Donaldson theory can now be proved more easily using Seiberg–Witten theory, though there are a number of open problems remaining in Donaldson theory, such as the Witten conjecture and the Atiyah–Floer conjecture.

See also
 Kronheimer–Mrowka basic class
 Instanton
 Floer homology
 Yang–Mills equations

References
.
.
.
.

Geometric topology
4-manifolds
Differential topology